The United Nations Audiovisual Library of International Law is a free online international law research and training tool. It was created and is maintained by the Codification Division of the United Nations Office of Legal Affairs as a part of its mandate under the United Nations Programme of Assistance in the Teaching, Study, Dissemination and Wider Appreciation of International Law.

Background 
The United Nations Audiovisual Library of International Law was established in 2008 under the United Nations Programme of Assistance in the Teaching, Study, Dissemination and Wider Appreciation of International Law as a tool for promoting knowledge of international law.

Faculty 
Over 240 international law experts from different regions, legal systems and sectors of the legal profession have recorded lectures for the Lecture Series, prepared introductory notes for the Historic Archives and contributed their scholarly writings to the Research Library.

Notable faculty members as of 1 July 2016:

 Abi-Saab, Georges
 Abraham, Ronny 
 Al-Khasawneh, Awn S.	 
 Annan, Kofi A.	 
 Bassiouni, M. Cherif	 
 Bennouna, Mohamed
 Brilmayer, Lea	 
 Buergenthal, Thomas	 	 
 Cançado Trindade, Antônio Augusto
 Cassese, Antonio		 
 Caron, David	 
 Charlesworth, Hilary	 
 Corell, Hans	 
 Couvreur, Philippe	 
 Crane, David M.	 
 Crawford, James	 
 Donoghue, Joan E.	 	 
 Dugard, John	 	 
 Ferencz, Benjamin B.	 
 Gaillard, Emmanuel	
 Gaja, Giorgio	 
 Goldstone, Richard	 
 Goodwin-Gill, Guy S.	 
 Greenwood, Christopher	 
 Heyns, Christof	 
 Higgins, Rosalyn	 
 Hossain, Kamal
 Jallow, Hassan Bubacar	 
 Kälin, Walter	 
 Keith, Kenneth	 
 Kingsbury, Benedict	 
 Klabbers, Jan	 
 Koh, Harold Hongju	 
 Koh, Tommy	 	 
 Laborde, Santiago Oñate	 
 Lacarte Muró, Julio	 
 Lamy, Pascal	 
 Lauterpacht, Elihu	 
 Mautner, Menachem
 Mayr-Harting, Thomas
 McDougal, Myres S.	 
 McWhinney, Edward	 	 
 Meron, Theodor	 
 Michel, Nicolas	 
 Momtaz, Djamchid	 
 Odio Benito, Elizabeth
 Owada, Hisashi
 Palmer, Geoffrey	 	 
 Paulsson, Jan	 
 Pellet, Alain	 
 Perera, Rohan A.	
 Pocar, Fausto
 Rodley, Nigel	 
 Robinson, Patrick	 
 Rozakis, Christos	 
 Sarooshi, Dan	 
 Schabas, William A.	 
 Scharf, Michael	 
 Schwebel, Stephen M.	 
 Sepúlveda Amor, Bernardo	 	 
 Shaw, Malcolm	 	 
 Shi, Jiuyong		 
 Simma, Bruno	 
 Simpson, Gerry	 
 Song, Sang Hyun	 
 Tladi, Dire	 
 Tomka, Peter	 
 Tomuschat, Christian	 
 Tuerk, Helmut	 	 
 Urquhart, Brian	 	 
 van Boven, Theo	
 van den Berg, Albert Jan	 
 van Zyl, Paul	 
 Vasciannie, Stephen C.	 
 Vincent, Robin	 
 Wedgwood, Ruth	 
 Wiessner, Siegfried	 
 Wilmshurst, Elizabeth	 
 Wolfrum, Rüdiger	 	 
 Wood, Michael
 Woolcott, Peter	 
 Xue, Hanqin	 
 Yusuf, Abdulqawi A.

Description and contents 
The Audiovisual Library is divided into three sections: the Historic Archives, the Lecture Series and the Research Library. While the Library's main language is English, many lectures are in other languages (Arabic, Chinese, French, Russian and Spanish) and all entries in the Historic Archives are translated into the six official languages of the United Nations.

Historic archives 
The Historic Archives provides detailed information on the negotiation process and significance of major international legal instruments. Each entry is accompanied by an introductory note prepared by an internationally recognized legal expert, a summary of the instrument's procedural history that led to its adoption and a list of all relevant preparatory documents. In some cases, audiovisual materials, including film footage, audio recordings and photos, of the negotiations are also available. The Historic Archives covers the following overarching subject areas:

 Criminal Law
 Decolonization
 Diplomatic and Consular Relations
 Disarmament
 Education, Science and Culture
 Environmental law
 Health
 Human Rights
 International Economic Law
 International Humanitarian Law
 International Organizations
 Law of International Relations
 Law of Outer Space
 Law of the Sea
 Law of Treaties
 Peace and Security
 Refugees and Stateless Persons
 Succession of States

Lecture series 
The Lecture series contains lectures recorded by members of the international legal community. Individuals who have participated in the Lecture Series include scholars, judges of international and regional judicial bodies, senior officials of international and regional organizations, and other international law practitioners. The themes covered by the Series are:

 Antarctica
 Arctic
 Arms Control and Disarmament
 Boundary Delimitation
 Courts and Tribunals
 Criminal Law and Procedure
 Cultural Heritage
 Development
 Diplomatic and Consular Relations
 Diplomatic Protection
 Disaster Prevention and Relief
 Environmental Law
 Health and Science
 Human Rights
 Human Security
 International Civil Aviation
 International Economic Law
 International Labour Law
 International Law
 International Migration Law
 International Organizations
 International Watercourses
 Law of Armed Conflict
 Law of Outer Space
 Law of the Sea
 Law of Treaties
 Peace and Security
 Peaceful Settlement of Disputes
 Regional Organizations
 Rule of Law, Democracy and Good Governance
 Specialized Agencies and Related Organizations
 States
 United Nations

Research Library 
The Research Library consists of an extensive online catalog of international law materials. The Library provides links to online collections of treaties, jurisprudence of courts and tribunals, official publications and documents of the United Nations and related international organizations, scholarly writings and other research materials including international law journals and yearbooks, as well as other training materials.

References

External links 
 United Nations Audiovisual Library of International Law
 United Nations Programme of Assistance in the Teaching, Study, Dissemination and Wider Appreciation of International Law
 Codification Division of the United Nations Office of Legal Affairs
 United Nations International Law Fellowship Programme
 United Nations Regional Courses in International Law
 United Nations Legal Publications

United Nations documents
Law libraries
International law
Online archives
Lecture series